Probable G-protein coupled receptor 158 is a protein that in humans is encoded by the GPR158 gene.

Function

This protein is an orphan class C GPCR. It is highly expressed in the brain, where it binds to RGS7, an inhibitor of Gi/o-coupled GPCR signaling, localizing it to the plasma membrane.

It is expressed at lower levels in other organs and shows an unusual subcellular localization pattern, being found at both the plasma membrane and in the nucleus.

Clinical significance

Role in mood regulation

GPR158 in the medial prefrontal cortex (mPFC) has been shown to regulate stress-induced depression in a mouse model of depression and has been found to be upregulated in post-mortem tissue samples from humans with major depressive disorder (MDD).

Role in prostate cancer
The GPR158 gene is an androgen-regulated gene that stimulates cell proliferation in prostate cancer cell lines, and it is linked to neuroendocrine differentiation.

References 

G protein-coupled receptors